Doodlakine is a town  east of Perth, Western Australia. It is within the Shire of Kellerberrin along the Great Eastern Highway. The town has a crossing loop for trains on the Perth-to-Kalgoorlie railway and serves as a stop on the MerredinLink rural train service.

History
The area was first visited by Europeans in 1864 when explorers came and charted the area. The word Doodlakine is Aboriginal word for a particular rock formation north of the townsite.

An area close to the townsite, along the road to the Yilgarn goldfields and near a reliable water supply, was set aside in 1891 for a town to be established. This was gazetted as the Doodlakine townsite in the same year. This area was gazetted as a second part of the townsite in 1899.

In 1932 the Wheat Pool of Western Australia announced that the town would have two grain elevators, each fitted with an engine, installed at the railway siding.

The town overflows with people each year during a music concert held at the pub. Hundreds of people come from around the state and camp behind the pub.

Doodlakine is affectionately known by the locals as "Doodlie".

Economy
The surrounding areas produce wheat and other cereal crops. The town is a receival site for Cooperative Bulk Handling.

Rail services 
Transwa's MerredinLink and Prospector services stop at Doodlakine, at least one service each day.

References

External links 

Towns in Western Australia
Wheatbelt (Western Australia)
Grain receival points of Western Australia